WOS may refer to:

 Kalma Airport, IATA airport code
 Worcester Shrub Hill railway station, Worcestershire, England (National Rail station code WOS)
 Wide Open Space (festival), an Australian music festival in the Northern Territory
 Wilson Ornithological Society, a U.S. ornithological organisation
 Wizards of OS, a computing group
 Web of Science (WoS), a platform for bibliometrics and scientometrics

"Wos" is also the stage name of Argentine rapper Valentín Oliva.

See also
 WhatsOnStage Awards (WOS Awards), theatre awards given by WhatsOnStage.com
 World of Sport (disambiguation), the name of various television series
 World of Sport Wrestling (WOS Wrestling), a UK wrestling promotion and television series